Albert Edwin Frazier (January 23, 1915 – August 18, 1999) was a Negro league baseball player and collegiate American football and baseball coach. He served as the head football coach and baseball coach at Savannah State University in Savannah, Georgia.

References

External links
 and Baseball-Reference Black Baseball stats and Seamheads

1915 births
1999 deaths
Cleveland Bears players
Jacksonville Red Caps players
Savannah State Tigers football coaches
Savannah State Tigers baseball coaches
Baseball players from Jacksonville, Florida
African-American baseball coaches
African-American coaches of American football
20th-century African-American sportspeople